is a side-scrolling beat 'em up video game developed and published by Sega, released for the Sega Mega Drive in Japan on June 25, 1993. A North American version was released only for the Sega Channel. The game was later re-released a number of times, as part of the Sega Genesis Collection for PlayStation 2 and PlayStation Portable, Sonic's Ultimate Genesis Collection for Xbox 360 and PlayStation 3, digitally on the Wii Virtual Console, and in the Sega Genesis Classics compilation.

Plot
Damud Hellstrike, the Prince of Darkness, has taken away the Golden Axe and put an evil curse over all the warriors. However, one of the heroes has their curse relieved and is sent to set things straight – lift the curse off the others, defeat the villain and return with the Golden Axe.

Gameplay

The gameplay has been expanded slightly but is essentially the same hack n' slash as the previous games. New features to the series include new characters, new moves (special attacks, teamwork attacks and teamwork magic spells) and junction points where the players can choose which path to take.

The five characters include a giant, Proud Cragger (プラウド・クラッガー), a humanoid black panther, Chronos "Evil" Rait (クロノス・”イビル”・レート), along with a swordsman, Kain Grinder (カイン・グリンダー), who resembles Ax Battler, and a swordswoman Sarah Burn (サラ・バーン) who resembles Tyris Flare. Gilius Thunderhead is the only character who appears from previous games, though he isn't playable and only appears during cut-scenes. Kain Grinder and Sarah Burn are referred to as Ax Battler and Tyris Flare respectively in the Sega Channel localization of the game.

Golden Axe III has many new moves, including blocking, sweep attacks, projectile attacks, defensive and offensive special attacks, and an updated grappling system. Furthermore, there are several abilities unique to certain characters: Proud possesses an airslam throw that does severe damage, while Chronos and Sarah can double jump and wall jump. In multiplayer mode, the characters can do team attacks similar to a human slingshot. Finally, each character has a super move that sends a projectile across the screen (except in the case of Chronos who leaps across the screen in an unstoppable lunging attack).

Some features that were removed in the second game were brought back in Golden Axe III. The mischievous gnomes from the original game who carried magic potions and food have returned in place of the enemy mages from the second game. Extra lives can be earned by freeing a certain number of prisoners scattered throughout the levels. Some prisoners are trapped in barrels, or stuck in crystal cells; others are guarded by an enemy that must be slain in order to free them. The magic system returned to the original version from Golden Axe, with characters using all collected magic potions every time, rather than allowing the player to choose how much magic to use by charging the magic meter like in Golden Axe II. The characters can use devastating new spells with combined casting. Each character does the same max magic damage. The mounts in Golden Axe III have turned into a hybrid snail-ostrich, instead of the chicken-leg or the dragon-raptors in the previous games. The mounts are known as Bizarrans. There are four types of Bizarrans in Golden Axe III. The firewave Bizarran is a Red Dragon that fires a fast moving wave of flame across the screen. The purple Snail uses its tongue to attack, the green Snail is a more powerful version with a longer tongue, and the Green Dragon bites and throws enemies over its shoulder. Players are able to choose their own route to the golden axe. If the player reaches the last boss and they are not on their last continue they may get the good ending.

Reception

In a feature on the game, Electronic Gaming Monthly commented, "Sega of Japan is not going to release this title here in the States - and for good reasons! The graphics are by far some of the most plain looking on the Mega Drive. Plus, the new magic effects aren't as impressive as before. So, if you are considering purchasing this title from an overseas seller, don't waste your bucks!"

IGN gave the Virtual Console release a 5 out of 10, saying "Legend has it that SEGA thought the quality of the product was so low, that it would be worthless or, worse, damaging to even publish the game in the States. And whether or not that's actually true, the quality assessment at its heart is on target – because Golden Axe III is certainly the worst of its franchise trilogy." Like Electronic Gaming Monthly, they described the graphics as bland and ugly, and particularly criticized that the gameplay showed no advancement from the first Golden Axe, even removing some of the advancements seen in Golden Axe II.

Notes

References

1993 video games
Cooperative video games
Fantasy video games
PlayStation Network games
Sega beat 'em ups
Sega Genesis games
Video games featuring female protagonists
Virtual Console games
Xbox 360 Live Arcade games
Side-scrolling beat 'em ups
Hack and slash games
Video game sequels
Video games developed in Japan
Golden Axe
Multiplayer and single-player video games